Secret Wars II is a nine-issue comic book limited series and crossover published from 1985 to 1986 by Marvel Comics. The series was written by Marvel's then editor-in-chief Jim Shooter and primarily pencilled by Al Milgrom.

The series was a sequel to original series Secret Wars, published in 1984 and 1985. The series tied-in with issues of other Marvel titles, with each "tie-in" featuring a "Secret Wars II" logo in the top right hand corner to indicate that it was a part of the overall story. This was the first time Marvel published a story where the reader would have to purchase multiple titles in order to read the entire story.

Plot
The entity that instigated the first Secret War, the Beyonder, visits Earth in search of enlightenment and inevitably comes into conflict with Earth's superhumans and the cosmic entities that exist in the Marvel Universe. At first, the Beyonder tries to figure out the meaning of the simple everyday tasks humans
do, such as: eating, sleeping, using the bathroom, etc, then the Beyonder works for a mobster and becomes very powerful and obsessed with gadgets. The Earth's heroes are very suspicious of him and this causes the Beyonder to retreat to a lone island. Mephisto recruits an army of supervillains with boosted strength, but The Thing fights them off after he is given augmented strength as well. The Beyonder falls in love with Dazzler, and tries to start a relationship with Boom Boom, but both turn him down. It is also explained how Doctor Doom, who was killed in the "normal" timeline, was able to appear in the first Secret Wars. The Beyonder recreates Doom's body from its disintegrated particles and sends him back in time to the start of the Secret Wars, causing Doom to live them in reverse order.

The Beyonder is eventually dealt with, although the heroes also have to prevent the destruction of the planet as a consequence of his actions. Beyonder attempts to become a human while still retaining all his powers. The demon Mephisto attempts to destroy him while in this form since he is now "merely human."

A sequel in the form of a single issue revealed that the Beyonder was an evolved Cosmic Cube and evolved into a being called Kosmos.

Tie-in issues
 July 1985:
Captain America #308; Iron Man #197; New Mutants #30; Uncanny X-Men #196
 Aug. 1985:
The Amazing Spider-Man #268; Fantastic Four #282; Web of Spider-Man #6
Sept. 1985:
Avengers #260; Daredevil #223; The Incredible Hulk #312 
Oct. 1985:
Alpha Flight #28; Avengers #261; Dazzler #40; Rom #72
Nov. 1985:
Doctor Strange #74; Fantastic Four #285; The Thing #30
Dec. 1985:
Cloak and Dagger #4; The Micronauts: The New Voyages #16; Power Pack #18; Power Man and Iron Fist #121; Thor #363
Jan. 1986:
Amazing Spider-Man #273; New Defenders #152; New Mutants #36; Peter Parker, The Spectacular Spider-Man #111; Uncanny X-Men #202
Feb. 1986:
Amazing Spider-Man #274; Avengers #265; Fantastic Four #288; New Mutants #37; Uncanny X-Men #203 
March 1986:
Avengers #266
March 1990:
Quasar #8
Dec. 1998:
Deadpool Team Up #1

Reception
Secret Wars II was 1985's bestselling comic book; however, it was "one of the most despised comics of the year" in the eyes of the fan press, receiving poor reviews and making numerous "worst comics of the year" lists.

Collected editions
 Secret Wars II (paperback),

Notes

References

The Marvel Chronology Project
Mitchell Brown's The Unofficial Comics Crossover Index page on Secret Wars II (via Wayback Machine)
The Unofficial Handbook of Marvel Comics Creators

1985 comics debuts
Marvel Comics storylines
Secret Wars
Crossover fiction
Crossover comics